The Carmel de la Place Maubert, also known as the Grand Couvent or Couvent des Barrés was a house of the Calced Carmelites located on Place Maubert on a site now occupied by the police station for the 5th arrondissement below the Rue de la Montagne-Sainte-Geneviève, Paris.

External links
Carmel.asso.fr

Bibliography
Chronique dite de Jean de Venette (ed. and transl. Colette Beaune), LGF. Paris, 2011: "Ce chroniqueur français du XIVe siècle, prieur du couvent du Carmel, place Maubert, a légué des chroniques sur la vie de Paris de 1340 à 1368, témoignant notamment de la Grande Peste de 1348".
Epitaphier du Vieux-Paris
Joyaux et Pierreries donnés par Jeanne d'Évreux aux Carmes: Archives de l'art français: document collection
Les Grands Carmes de Paris in Abbayes, monastères et couvents de Paris, Paul and Marie-Louise Biver
Histoire de la ville et de tout le diocèse de Paris (volume 2), Jean Lebeuf
Aubin-Louis Millin, Antiquités nationales, 1792, pp. 1-48

Buildings and structures in the 5th arrondissement of Paris
Former Christian monasteries in France
Carmelite monasteries in France